Kim You-Sung  (born 4 December 1988) is a South Korean footballer who plays for Goyang Hi FC in the K League Challenge.

External links 

1988 births
Living people
South Korean footballers
Gyeongnam FC players
Daegu FC players
Gwangju FC players
Goyang Zaicro FC players
K League 1 players
K League 2 players
Association football midfielders